Anukunnadi Okati Ayinadi Okkati is a 2020 Indian Telugu-language black comedy film directed by debutant Baalu Adusumilli. The film stars Dhanya Balakrishna, Tridha Choudhury, Komalee Prasad and Siddhi Idnani. The story revolves around four modern girls who go to Goa for vacation where they hire a male stripper and confusion begins to lead to dramatic events. This film is an adaption of the 2017 American film Rough Night.

Plot
Dhanya, a carefree girl who is a protective sister as well takes her three female friends to Goa searching for her sister. She sees a picture of her sister with a guy who has been synced on her phone. She starts investigating about her sister and finds out that the guy pictured with her sister is a prostitute. She learns that her sister's phone was stolen and she has misunderstood the situation. Things get worse and the guy is killed. The story follows the girls as they hilariously struggle to save themselves.

Cast
 Dhanya Balakrishna as Dhanya, a Software engineer
 Tridha Choudhury as Tridha, a News reporter 
 Komalee Prasad as Komalee, a Fashion Designer
 Siddhi Idnani as Siddhi, a Frustrated married wife
 Basha as Jack
 Sameer Hasan as Police Inspector 
 Raghu Babu as News Channel Owner
 Raghu Karumanchi as Cult Kameshwar Rao, a film director 
 Madhunandan as Shyam,  husband of Siddhi
 Himaja as Srujana 
 Kalyani
 Lobo
 JR Chaitu
 Sagar
 Bhanu Teja

Soundtrack

Release and reception
The film was released in India on 6 March 2020. It was later released on Amazon Prime in April 2020.

The Times of India rated the film 1.5 stars out of 5 and wrote, "The film and its contrived storyline doesn’t give any of the actors enough scope to perform." NTV Telugu criticised the film for its poor storyline and lack of good humour. On performances, the reviewer stated that "Dhanya comes with a lot of ease, thanks to her familiarity with Telugu. Komalee Prasad, a Telugu-speaking actress, does a fine job as well. Tridha and Siddhi could have been much better."

References

External links 
 

2020 films
2020s Telugu-language films
2020s masala films
Films shot in Hyderabad, India
Films shot in Andhra Pradesh
Films set in Hyderabad, India
Films set in Goa
Films shot in Goa
Indian black comedy films
2020 directorial debut films
Indian buddy comedy films
Indian remakes of American films
2020 black comedy films